Wat Chedi Yot Thong is a historical Buddhist temple in Phitsanulok, Thailand.

History
Wat Chedi Yot Thong was constructed during the Sukhothai era.

Features
The temple is famous for its Sukhothai-style bud shaped chedi. This chedi is the only remaining one of this style in Phitsanulok Province. On the campus, there is a complex of monk houses, facing a small lake, and there is a small, modern temple structure nearby.

References

Chedi Yod Thong